Casa Grande Stone Church is a church located at 110 West Florence Boulevard in Casa Grande, Arizona.

The church was originally built by Michael Sullivan, a local stonemason. It was the largest fieldstone building to be built by Sullivan in Casa Grande and served as the First Presbyterian Church of that town. Sullivan built the structure with the help of Los Angeles architect Robert Orr. The first service held in the church, with its glittering copper-plated dome, was in January 1928. The Casa Grande Historical Society acquired the Stone Church in June 1977. The building was added to the National Register of Historic Places in 1978. It is currently home to The Museum of Casa Grande.

See also

 List of historic properties in Casa Grande, Arizona

References

External links

The Museum of Casa Grande

Churches in Arizona
Churches on the National Register of Historic Places in Arizona
Churches completed in 1927
Churches in Casa Grande, Arizona
National Register of Historic Places in Pinal County, Arizona
Pueblo Revival architecture in Arizona